Simpani may refer to:

Simpani, Gandaki, Nepal
Simpani, Sagarmatha, Nepal